Two suicide bombers attacked a busy junction and a restaurant in the Somali town Baidoa. 30 people, mostly civilians, were killed and another 40 were injured. Al-Shabaab claimed responsibility, saying they targeted government officials and security forces.

References

Somali Civil War (2009–present)
Al-Shabaab (militant group) attacks
Mass murder in 2016
Terrorist incidents in Somalia in 2016
Attacks on restaurants in Africa
Building bombings in Somalia